Bullbrook is a suburb of Bracknell , in the English county of Berkshire, formerly part of the parish of Winkfield. It is named after the Bull Brook which runs through the area, although most of the brook now runs underground in culverts. Bullbrook is one of the earlier estates of Bracknell and was built in the late 1950s.

The estate lies largely north of the A329 road and its borders begin immediately east of Bracknell town centre. The section between the A329 and the railway line, Bullbrook 4, is now part of Harmans Water ward following boundary changes in 2003.

Facilities include a small shopping centre, a community centre, several public houses and Holly Spring school. Lily Hill Park is an extensive area of woodland and historic parkland. Within the park is Lily Hill House, built between 1814-1817 and now used as a business centre.

The eastern industrial area is a business area. The Royal Berkshire Bracknell Clinic is at Brants Bridge.

Kezia Obama, the stepmother of United States President Barack Obama, is a resident of Bullbrook.

References

External links 
Bullbrook history

Bracknell